Kallaste is a town in Tartu County, Estonia.

Kallaste may also refer to:

Places
Kallaste, Kihelkonna Parish, a village in Saare County, Estonia
Kallaste, Muhu Parish, a village in Saare County, Estonia
Kallaste, Haanja Parish, a village in Haanja, Võru County, Estonia
Kallaste, Mõniste Parish, a village in Mõniste, Võru County, Estonia

Other uses
Kallaste (surname)